The 2016 Mississippi Democratic presidential primary took place on March 8 in the U.S. state of Mississippi as one of the Democratic Party's primaries ahead of the 2016 presidential election.

On the same day, the Democratic Party held a second primary in Michigan, while the Republican Party held primaries in four states, including their own Mississippi primary.

Opinion polling

Results

Results by county

Analysis 
After losing badly in Mississippi to Barack Obama eight years earlier, Hillary Clinton managed a 66-point routing against Bernie Sanders in the state in 2016. She carried all counties and won across all demographics, income levels and educational attainment levels. The key to Clinton's success, however, was an 89-11 showing among African American voters, who made up 71% of the Democratic electorate in the state.

Mississippi gave Clinton her largest win in any state during the 2016 primaries.

References

Mississippi
Democratic primary
2016